Summerhill is an area of the city of Aberdeen, in the north-east of Scotland, United Kingdom.

References 

Areas of Aberdeen